Michael A. Cicconetti (born 1951) is a retired Municipal Court judge who presided in Painesville, Lake County, Ohio, United States, dispensing a unique brand of what he calls creative justice. The judge often left the choice of penalty to the defendant, who was faced with spending time in jail or undergoing one of Cicconetti's unusual punishments. These often involved placing the defendant in a similar position to that of the defendant's victim at the time of the crime.

Cicconetti's first creative sentence, which involved a violation relating to a stopped school bus, occurred in the mid-1990s. Famously he offered 26-year-old Ohio housewife Michelle Murray the option (in return for a reduced prison sentence) of spending a night in the woods for abandoning 35 kittens in a forest in wintertime; he said: "You don't do that. You don't leave these poor little animals out and, yes, I wanted to set an example for her future conduct or anybody else who was contemplating doing such a thing". On other occasions he ordered noisy neighbors to spend a day of silence in the forest or listen to classical music instead of rock. In all cases the judge attempted to place a link between the perpetrated offense and its punishment.

Due in part to the popularity of his actions, he won the presidency of the American Judges Association. He attributes his unusual approach to his background. He is an Eagle Scout, earning the award in 1964, as a member of Scout Troop 64 in Painesville, Ohio. He was the oldest of nine siblings who had to work on ore boats throughout the Great Lakes as a deckhand and deckwatch to fund himself through college. After graduating from St. Leo University, he became Clerk of the Painesville Municipal Court while attending Cleveland State University Law School at night.

Where the national recidivism (repeat offender) rate is over 75%, the rate in Judge Cicconetti's court was just 10%.

His philosophy is exemplified by the following two quotations:

Sentences such as Cicconetti's are becoming more popular across the United States, and one judge has cited him specifically as being the influence for one of her own sentences.

In February 2019 Cicconetti announced that he planned to retire later in the year. He retired from being a judge on September 22, 2019.

Unusual sentences
A man who committed child abuse was sent to a school in a dog outfit and had to talk about child safety. 
During heavy blizzards, he ordered defendants to clear snow at a retirement home.
A man caught with a loaded gun was sent to a morgue to see corpses.
A woman who abandoned 35 kittens in a forest spent a night in the woods; it was snowing that night.
A young man who stole a bicycle spent 10 days riding a bicycle to support a local charity. 
A man who shot a dog was sentenced to donating 40 lbs of dog food on every holiday to the Lake County Animal Shelter.
Two teenagers who scrawled 666 on a nativity figure of Jesus had to lead a donkey through the streets, with a sign saying: "Sorry for the jackass offense, but he is soooo cute!"
Teenagers who flattened tires on school buses were ordered to throw a picnic for the primary school children whose outing was cancelled due to the prank.
A man who committed a traffic violation while shouting "pigs" at police officers was made to stand on a street corner with a 350-pound pig and a sign that said "This is not a police officer."
An 18-year-old male who stole pornography from an adult book store was ordered to sit outside the store wearing a blindfold and holding a sign that read "See no evil."
Three men soliciting sex were ordered to wear chicken suits holding signs that read "No Chicken Ranch in Painesville".
In January 2008, Cicconetti sentenced a man who stole a red collection kettle holding about $250 from the Salvation Army to spend 24 hours homeless.
A woman who was convicted of stealing from a church was ordered to spell out the sentence "I stole coins from this church" entirely in coins and apologize to each worshipper as they entered the church.
A woman who skipped out on a cab fare was ordered to walk 30 miles in 48 hours.  Thirty miles was the distance the cab driver had driven her before she skipped out on the fare.
A woman who pleaded guilty to assault for using pepper spray on a man was given the choice to serve 30 days in jail or serve three days of community service and be shot herself with pepper spray.  After agreeing to the latter she was sprayed and found out it was only water.
A woman who pleaded guilty to animal cruelty and neglect for abandoning a dog in an uninhabitable house was given a choice of serving 90 days in jail or picking up garbage for 8 hours in the Lake County Landfill. The defendant chose to work in the landfill.
A nanny accused of hitting a boy with a belt was compelled to read articles on the consequences of child abuse, and then discuss them in the courtroom in front of the judge, the victim's mother, and spectators.

Personal life 
Formerly having been a lifelong member of the Democratic Party, he switched to the Republican Party, so he could vote for his son, Gabe, who ran for Recorder of Lake County, Ohio in 2020. In that same statement he said that he did not regret the choice, citing comments made by then-Senate Minority Leader Chuck Schumer about Supreme Court Justices [Brett Kavanaugh & Neil Gorsuch] and saying: "This is no longer the political party my Dad, Angelo, taught and encouraged me to participate and join, a party for the working man, projecting its beliefs in a respectful and ethical manner." However, he does not approve of Donald Trump.

References

External links
 Judge Michael A. Cicconetti from the official Painesville Municipal Court website

1951 births
Ohio state court judges
Living people
Saint Leo University alumni
Cleveland–Marshall College of Law alumni